Pierrefonds-Roxboro is a borough of the city of Montreal. It was created January 1, 2006, following the demerger of parts of the city.

Geography
It is composed of the former municipalities of Pierrefonds and Roxboro, spanning the northern part of the West Island. Besides its land borders with the borough of L'Île-Bizard–Sainte-Geneviève, as well as the boroughs of Saint-Laurent and Ahuntsic-Cartierville to the east, it borders the municipalities of Senneville, Sainte-Anne-de-Bellevue, Kirkland, and Dollard-des-Ormeaux.

The borough has an area of 27.1 km² (10½ sq. mi.) and a population of 69,297.

Pierrefonds has the largest nature park in the City of Montreal, the Cap-Saint-Jacques Nature Park. It is also home to several English elementary schools (St. Anthony School, St. Charles School, Greendale, Terry Fox School, Kingsdale Academy) as well as the public English high school, Pierrefonds Community High School. There are also three French private schools, Collège Charlemagne, Collège Beaubois and École Charles-Perrault.

Roxboro has two nature parks known as Roxboro Island and Roxboro Woods, three elementary schools (Lalande, French; Charles A. Kirkland, English; and Socrates, Greek) as well as a small library and a large library (1997). (William G. Boll). It also had a Federal Canada Post office 1996-12-13.  The former headquarters of the Roxboro Volunteer Fire Brigade is now Station 58 of the Service de sécurité incendie de Montréal and houses a single engine company.  The adjacent former Roxboro Town Hall houses the Fire Prevention officers for Fire Division 11, and also serves as a borough point of service for the Roxboro area.

Politics

Federally it is part of the ridings of Lac-Saint-Louis and Pierrefonds-Dollard, provincially it's part of Nelligan and Robert-Baldwin.

Transportation 
The borough is served by the Sunnybrooke and Roxboro-Pierrefonds stations on the Deux-Montagnes commuter train line. Major thoroughfares include Saint Charles Boulevard, Saint Jean Boulevard, Des Sources Boulevard, as well as Gouin, and Pierrefonds Boulevards.

Demographics

Education
The Centre de services scolaire Marguerite-Bourgeoys operates Francophone public schools, but were previously operated by the Commission scolaire Marguerite-Bourgeoys until June 15, 2020. The change was a result of a law passed by the Quebec government that changed the school board system from denominational to linguistic.

Specialized schools include:
 École secondaire Rose-Virginie-Pelletier (RVP)

Primary schools include:
 du Grand-Chêne
 Harfang-des-Neiges
 Lalande
 Murielle-Dumont
 Perce-Neige
 Saint-Gérard
 Charles-Perrault

The Lester B. Pearson School Board (LBPSB) operates Anglophone public schools.

Vocational Education:
 West Island Career Centre

High schools:
 Pierrefonds Community High School

Elementary Schools:
 Beechwood Elementary School
 Greendale Elementary School
 St. Anthony Elementary School 
 St. Charles Elementary School
 Terry Fox Elementary School
 Kingsdale Academy
 In addition, Westpark Elementary and Wilder-Penfield Elementary in Dollard-des-Ormeaux and Margaret Manson Elementary School in Kirkland serve portions of the borough.

Public libraries
The Montreal Public Libraries Network operates the Pierrefonds Branch (13 555, boulevard Pierrefonds) and the William G. Boll Branch (110, rue Cartier) in the borough.

See also
 Boroughs of Montreal
 Districts of Montreal
 Municipal reorganization in Quebec

References

External links

 Borough website

Celebrities include the Tudor family

 
Boroughs of Montreal